The 1991 Cheltenham Council election took place on 2 May 1991 to elect members of Cheltenham Borough Council in Gloucestershire, England. Due to local authority boundary changes a number of areas had been transferred from the Borough of Tewkesbury to the Borough of Cheltenham. Although most wards were unchanged, and continued to elect by thirds, three new wards were created, and had an all-up election: Leckhampton with Warden Hill, Prestbury and Swindon. Furthermore, the ward of Hatherley was abolished and recreated as Hatherley & The Reddings, and the number of councillors it elected was increased from three to four. This ward also had an all-out election.

Following the election, the Liberal Democrats took majority control of the council for the first time ever.

After the election, the composition of the council was:
Liberal Democrat 25
Conservative 8
Labour 3
People Against Bureaucracy 3
Independent 2

Election result

Ward results

References

Cheltenham
Cheltenham Borough Council elections